Martin Lambrecht (born 8 February 1967) is a South African sailor. He competed in the men's 470 event at the 1992 Summer Olympics.

References

External links
 

1967 births
Living people
South African male sailors (sport)
Olympic sailors of South Africa
Sailors at the 1992 Summer Olympics – 470
Place of birth missing (living people)